Your Neighbor's Wife is a 2013 South Korean television series starring Yum Jung-ah, Jung Joon-ho, Shin Eun-kyung and Kim Yu-seok. It aired on JTBC from October 14 to December 24, 2013.

Synopsis
The story of two couples in their 40s who live in the same apartment building.

Cast

Main
 Yum Jung-ah as Chae Song-ha
 Jung Joon-ho as Min Sang-shik
 Shin Eun-kyung as Hong Kyung-joo
 Kim Yu-seok as Ahn Sun-gyu

Supporting
 Jung Han-yong as Vice-president
 Kim Boo-sun as Gook Young-ja
 Lee Se-chang as Pig dad
 Yoon Ji-min as Kim Ji-young
 Yang Jin-woo as Director Jung
 Moon Bo-ryung as Eun-chae
 Yum Dong-hun as Yang Sang-moo
 Lee Byung-joon as President Bu
 Seo Yi-sook as Ha Sung-in
 Im Shi-eun as Min-kyung
 Im Je-noh as Min-seok
 Lee Han-na as Eun-mi
 Kim Seung-yoon as Min Eun-kyung
 Yoon Hong-bin as Tae-ho
 Kim Yong-hee as Doctor Yoon
 Jeon Jin-woo as Min-shik

Original soundtrack

Part 1

Part 2

Part 3

Part 4

Viewership
In this table,  represent the lowest ratings and  represent the highest ratings.

References

External links
  
 
 

JTBC television dramas
Korean-language television shows
2013 South Korean television series debuts
2013 South Korean television series endings
Television series by Doremi Entertainment
Television series by Drama House